This list consists of dedicated products developed or published by Nintendo in any region. Products created by third parties on Nintendo's platforms are not included unless licensed to or distributed by Nintendo.

Toys and cards

Amiibo

Arcade

Home consoles

Color TV-Game

Nintendo Entertainment System and Famicom

Famicom Disk System

Super NES and Super Famicom

Satellaview

Nintendo Power

Nintendo 64

64DD

GameCube

Wii

WiiWare

Wii U

Handheld consoles

Game & Watch

Game Boy

Virtual Boy

Game Boy Color

Nintendo Power

Game Boy Advance

e-Reader

Pokémon mini

Nintendo DS

DSiWare

Nintendo 3DS

{| class="wikitable plainrowheaders sortable"
|-
!rowspan="2"|Title
!rowspan="2"|Developer(s)
!colspan="3"|Release date
!rowspan="2" class="unsortable"|
|-
!data-sort-type="date"|
!data-sort-type="date"|
!data-sort-type="date"|
|-
|AR Games
|Nintendo
|February 26, 2011||March 27, 2011||March 25, 2011
|
|-
|Face Raiders
|HAL Laboratory
|February 26, 2011||March 27, 2011||March 25, 2011
|
|-
|Mii Maker
|Nintendo
|February 26, 2011
|March 27, 2011
|March 25, 2011
|
|-
|Miiverse
|Nintendo
|February 26, 2011
|March 27, 2011
|March 25, 2011
|
|-
|Nintendo 3DS Activity Log
|Nintendo
|February 26, 2011
|March 27, 2011
|March 25, 2011
|
|-
|Nintendo 3DS Camera
|Nintendo
|February 26, 2011
|March 27, 2011
|March 25, 2011
|
|-
|Nintendo 3DS Internet Browser
|Nintendo
|February 26, 2011||March 27, 2011||March 25, 2011
|
|-
|Nintendo 3DS Sound
|Nintendo
|February 26, 2011
|March 27, 2011
|March 25, 2011
|
|-
|Nintendo Zone
|Nintendo
|February 26, 2011
|March 27, 2011
|March 25, 2011
|
|-
|StreetPass Mii Plaza
|Nintendo SPD
|February 26, 2011
|March 27, 2011
|March 25, 2011
|
|-
|Nintendogs + Cats: French Bulldog & New Friends,
Golden Retriever & New Friends and Toy Poodle & New Friends
|Nintendo EAD
|February 26, 2011
|March 27, 2011
|March 25, 2011
|
|-
|Super Street Fighter IV: 3D Edition
|Capcom
|February 26, 2011
|March 27, 2011
|March 25, 2011
|
|-
|Pilotwings Resort|Monster Games
Nintendo SPD
|April 14, 2011
|March 27, 2011
|March 25, 2011
|
|-
|Steel Diver|Nintendo EAD
Vitei
|May 12, 2011
|March 27, 2011
|May 6, 2011
|
|-
|One Piece Unlimited Cruise SP
|Bandai Namco Games
|May 26, 2011
|?
|February 10, 2012
|
|-
|The Legend of Zelda: Ocarina of Time 3D|Grezzo
Nintendo EAD Tokyo
|June 16, 2011
|June 19, 2011
|June 17, 2011
|
|-
|Star Fox 64 3D|
|July 14, 2011
|September 9, 2011
|September 9, 2011
|
|-
|Pokémon Rumble Blast|Ambrella
|August 11, 2011||October 24, 2011||December 2, 2011
|
|-
|Hana to Ikimono Rittai Zukan|Nintendo
|September 29, 2011
|Unreleased
|Unreleased
|
|-
|Tetris: Axis|Hudson Soft
|October 20, 2011||October 2, 2011||October 21, 2011
|
|-
|Super Mario 3D Land|Nintendo EAD Tokyo
|November 3, 2011||November 13, 2011||November 18, 2011
|
|-
|Mario Kart 7|
|December 1, 2011||December 4, 2011||December 2, 2011
|
|-
|Spirit Camera: The Cursed Memoir|Tecmo Koei
|January 12, 2012
|April 13, 2012
|June 29, 2012
|
|-
|Resident Evil: Revelations|Capcom
|January 26, 2012
|February 7, 2012
|January 27, 2012
|
|-
|Mario & Sonic at the London 2012 Olympic Games|Sega Sports R&D Racjin
|March 1, 2012
|February 14, 2012
|February 9, 2012
|
|-
|Kid Icarus: Uprising|Project Sora
|March 22, 2012
|March 23, 2012
|March 23, 2012
|
|-
|Kingdom Hearts 3D: Dream Drop Distance|Square Enix
|March 29, 2012
|July 31, 2012
|July 20, 2012
|
|-
|Fire Emblem: Awakening|Intelligent Systems Nintendo SPD
|April 19, 2012
|February 4, 2013
|April 19, 2013
|
|-
|Mario Tennis Open|Camelot Software Planning
|May 24, 2012
|May 20, 2012
|May 25, 2012
|
|-
|Culdcept|OmiyaSoft
|June 28, 2012
|Unreleased
|Unreleased
|
|-
|Nintendo Pocket Football Club|ParityBit
|July 12, 2012
|Unreleased
|April 17, 2014
|
|-
|Heroes of Ruin|n-Space
|Unreleased
|July 17, 2012
|June 15, 2012
|
|-
|Art Academy: Lessons for Everyone!|Headstrong Games
|September 13, 2012
|October 1, 2012
|July 28, 2012
|
|-
|Freakyforms Deluxe: Your Creations, Alive!|Asobism
|April 10, 2013
|November 5, 2012
|July 28, 2012
|
|-
|Brain Age: Concentration Training|Nintendo SPD
|July 28, 2012
|February 10, 2013
|July 28, 2017
|
|-
|New Super Mario Bros. 2|Nintendo EAD Group No. 4
|July 28, 2012
|August 19, 2012
|August 17, 2012
|
|-
|Style Savvy: Trendsetters|Syn Sophia Nintendo SPD
|September 27, 2012
|October 22, 2012
|November 16, 2012
|
|-
|Crosswords Plus|Nintendo Software Technology
|Unreleased
|October 1, 2012
|Unreleased
|
|-
|Professor Layton and the Miracle Mask|Level-5
|February 26, 2011
|October 28, 2012
|October 26, 2012
|
|-
|Animal Crossing: New Leaf|Nintendo EAD
|November 8, 2012
|June 9, 2013
|June 14, 2013
|
|-
|Paper Mario: Sticker Star|Intelligent Systems
|December 6, 2012
|November 11, 2012
|December 7, 2012
|
|-
|Pokémon Mystery Dungeon: Gates to Infinity|Spike Chunsoft
|23 November 2012
|24 March 2013
|17 May 2013
|
|-
|Luigi's Mansion: Dark Moon|Next Level Games
Nintendo SPD
|March 20, 2013
|March 24, 2013
|March 28, 2013
|
|-
|Castlevania: Lords of Shadow Mirror of Fate|MercurySteam
|March 20, 2013
|March 5, 2013
|March 8, 2013
|
|-
|Monster Hunter 3 Ultimate|Capcom
|December 10, 2011
|March 19, 2013
|March 22, 2013
|
|-
|Tomodachi Life|Nintendo SPD
|April 18, 2013
|June 6, 2014
|June 6, 2014
|
|-
|Lego City Undercover: The Chase Begins|TT Fusion
|March 5, 2015
|21 April 2013
|26 April 2013
|
|-
|Donkey Kong Country Returns 3D|Monster Games
|June 13, 2013
|May 24, 2013
|May 24, 2013
|
|-
|Mario & Luigi: Dream Team|AlphaDream
Good-Feel
|July 18, 2013
|August 11, 2013
|July 12, 2013
|
|-
|Inazuma Eleven 3: Lighting Bolt and Bomb Blast
|Level-5
|December 27, 2012
|Unreleased
|September 27, 2013
|
|-
|Pokémon X and Y
|Game Freak
|October 12, 2013
|October 12, 2013
|October 12, 2013
|
|-
|Sonic Lost World|Sonic TeamSega
|October 24, 2013
|October 29, 2013
|October 18, 2013
|
|-
|Professor Layton and the Azran Legacy|Level-5
|February 28, 2013
|February 28, 2014
|November 8, 2013
|
|-
|Daigasso! Band Brothers P|Intelligent Systems
|November 14, 2013
|Unreleased
|Unreleased
|
|-
|The Legend of Zelda: A Link Between Worlds|Nintendo EAD
|December 26, 2013
|November 22, 2013
|November 22, 2013
|
|-
|Lego Legends of Chima: Laval's Journey|TT Fusion
|January 23, 2014
|Unreleased
|Unreleased
|
|- 
|Mario Party: Island Tour|NDcube
|March 20, 2014
|November 22, 2013
|January 17, 2014
|
|-
|Nintendo 3DS Guide: Louvre|indieszero
|November 27, 2013
|December 2, 2013
|November 27, 2013
|
|-
|Bravely Default|Silicon Studio
|December 5, 2013
|February 7, 2014
|December 6, 2013
|
|-
|Scribblenauts Unlimited|5th Cell
|Unreleased
|Unreleased
|December 6, 2013
|
|-
|Kirby: Triple Deluxe|HAL Laboratory
|January 11, 2014
|May 2, 2014
|May 16, 2014
|
|-
|Inazuma Eleven 3: Team Ogre Attacks!|Level-5
|December 27, 2012
|Unreleased
|February 14, 2014
|
|-
|Fossil Fighters: Frontier|Spike Chunsoft
|February 27, 2014
|March 20, 2015
|May 29, 2015
|
|-
|Yoshi's New Island|Arzest
|July 24, 2014
|March 14, 2014
|March 14, 2014
|
|-
|Professor Layton vs. Phoenix Wright: Ace Attorney|Level-5
Capcom
|November 29, 2012
|March 29, 2014
|March 28, 2014
|
|-
|Disney Magical World 
|h.a.n.d. Bandai Namco Games
|August 1, 2013
|April 11, 2014
|October 24, 2014
|
|-
|Wagamama Fashion: Girls Mode Yokubari Sengen! Tokimeki Up!|syn Sophia
|April 17, 2014
|Unreleased
|Unreleased
|
|-
|Mario Golf: World Tour|Camelot Software Planning
|May 1, 2014
|May 2, 2014
|May 2, 2014
|
|-
|Inazuma Eleven GO Light and Shadow|Level-5
|December 15, 2011
|Unreleased
|June 13, 2014
|
|-
|Pokémon Art Academy|Headstrong Games
|June 19, 2014
|October 24, 2014
|July 4, 2014
|
|-
|Phonics Fun with Biff, Chip & Kipper (Vol. 1 - 3)|IE Institute
|April 4, 2013
|Unreleased
|September 12, 2014
|
|-
|Super Smash Bros. for Nintendo 3DS|Bandai Namco Games
Sora Ltd.
|September 13, 2014
|October 3, 2014
|October 3, 2014
|
|-
|Fantasy Life|Level-5 Brownie Brown h.a.n.d.
|December 27, 2012
|October 24, 2014
|September 26, 2014
|
|-
|Ultimate NES Remix|Nintendo EAD Tokyo
|August 27, 2015
|December 5, 2014
|November 7, 2014
|
|-
|Pokémon Omega Ruby and Alpha Sapphire
|Game Freak
|November 21, 2014
|November 21, 2014
|November 28, 2014
|
|-
|Sonic Boom: Shattered Crystal|Sanzaru Games
|December 18, 2014
|November 11, 2014
|November 21, 2014
|
|-
|The Legend of Zelda: Majora's Mask 3D|Grezzo
|February 14, 2015
|February 13, 2015
|February 13, 2015
|
|-
|Monster Hunter 4 Ultimate
|Capcom
|Unreleased
|February 13, 2015
|February 13, 2015
|
|-
|Mario vs. Donkey Kong: Tipping Stars|Nintendo Software Technology
|March 19, 2015
|March 5, 2015
|March 20, 2015
|
|-
|Gardening Mama 2: Forest Friends 
|Cooking Mama Limited
|September 26, 2013
|April 29, 2014
|March 6, 2015
|
|-
|Cooking Mama 5: Bon Appétit! 
|Cooking Mama Limited
|November 21, 2013
|September 16, 2014
|March 6, 2015
|
|-
|Code Name: S.T.E.A.M.|Intelligent Systems Nintendo SPD
|May 14, 2015
|March 13, 2015
|May 15, 2015
|
|-
|Inazuma Eleven GO Chrono Stones: Wildfire and Thunderflash 
|Level-5
|December 13, 2012
|Unreleased
|March 27, 2015
|
|-
|Style Savvy: Fashion Forward|Syn Sophia
Nintendo SPD
|April 16, 2015
|August 19, 2016
|November 20, 2015
|
|-
|Hatsune Miku: Project Mirai DX|Sega
|May 28, 2015
|September 8, 2015
|September 11, 2015
|
|-
|Puzzle & Dragons Z + Super Mario Bros. Edition|GungHo Online Entertainment
|Unreleased
|May 22, 2015
|May 8, 2015
|
|-
|Fire Emblem Fates: Birthright and Conquest
|Intelligent Systems Nintendo SPD
|June 25, 2015
|February 19, 2016
|May 20, 2016
|
|-
|Rhythm Heaven Megamix|Nintendo SPD
|June 11, 2015
|June 15, 2016
|October 21, 2016
|
|-
|Animal Crossing: Happy Home Designer|Nintendo EAD
|July 30, 2015
|September 25, 2015
|October 2, 2015
|
|-
|LBX: Little Battlers eXperience|Level-5
|July 5, 2012
|August 21, 2015
|September 4, 2015
|
|-
|Pokémon Super Mystery Dungeon|Spike Chunsoft
|September 17, 2015
|November 20, 2015
|February 19, 2016
|
|-
|Picross 3D Round 2|HAL Laboratory
|October 1, 2015
|September 1, 2016
|December 2, 2016
|
|-
|Chibi-Robo! Zip Lash|Skip Ltd.
|October 8, 2015
|October 9, 2015
|November 6, 2015
|
|-
|The Legend of Zelda: Tri Force Heroes|Nintendo EPD
Grezzo
|October 22, 2015
|October 23, 2015
|October 23, 2015
|
|-
|Yo-kai Watch|Level-5
|July 11, 2013
|November 6, 2015
|April 29, 2016
|
|-
|Pokémon Rumble World|Ambrella
|November 19, 2015
|April 29, 2016
|January 22, 2016
|
|-
|Mario & Luigi: Paper Jam|AlphaDream
|December 3, 2015
|January 22, 2016
|December 4, 2015
|
|-
|Story of Seasons|Marvelous AQL
|February 27, 2014
|March 31, 2015
|December 31, 2015
|
|-
|Mario & Sonic at the Rio 2016 Olympic Games|Sega Sports R&D Arzest
|February 18, 2016
|March 18, 2016
|April 8, 2016
|
|-
|Bravely Second: End Layer|Silicon Studio
|April 23, 2015
|April 15, 2016
|February 26, 2016
|
|-
|Hyrule Warriors Legends|Omega Force
Team Ninja
|January 21, 2016
|March 25, 2016
|March 24, 2016
|
|-
|Disney Art Academy|Headstrong Games
|April 7, 2016
|May 13, 2016
|July 15, 2016
|
|-
|Kirby: Planet Robobot|HAL Laboratory
|April 28, 2016
|June 10, 2016
|June 10, 2016
|
|-
|Shovel Knight|Yacht Club Games
|June 30, 2016
|June 26, 2014
|November 5, 2014
|
|-
|Teddy Together|Arika
|June 20, 2013
|Unreleased
|July 1, 2016
|
|-
|Culdcept Revolt|OmiyaSoft
|July 7, 2016
|October 3, 2017
|October 6, 2017
|
|-
|Monster Hunter Generations
|Capcom
|November 28, 2015
|July 15, 2016
|July 15, 2016
|
|-
|Metroid Prime: Federation Force|Next Level Games
|August 25, 2016
|August 19, 2016
|September 2, 2016
|
|-
|Dragon Quest VII: Fragments of the Forgotten Past|Heartbeat ArtePiazza
|February 7, 2013
|September 16, 2016
|September 16, 2016
|
|-
|Yo-kai Watch 2: Bony Spirits and Fleshy Souls
|Level-5
|July 10, 2014
|September 30, 2016
|April 7, 2017
|
|-
|Mario Party: Star Rush|NDcube
|October 20, 2016
|November 4, 2016
|October 7, 2016
|
|-
|Sonic Boom: Fire & Ice|Sanzaru Games
|October 27, 2016
|September 27, 2016
|September 30, 2016
|
|-
|Disney Magical World 2|h.a.n.d. Bandai Namco Games
|November 5, 2015
|October 14, 2016
|October 14, 2016
|
|-
|Pokémon Sun and Moon
|Game Freak
|November 18, 2016
|November 18, 2016
|November 23, 2016
|
|-
|Animal Crossing: New Leaf - Welcome Amiibo|Nintendo EPD
|November 23, 2016
|December 5, 2016
|November 25, 2016
|
|-
|Super Mario Maker for Nintendo 3DS|Nintendo EPD
|December 1, 2016
|December 2, 2016
|December 2, 2016
|
|-
|Miitopia|Nintendo EPD
|December 8, 2016
|July 28, 2017
|July 28, 2017
|
|-
|Momotarou Dentetsu 2017: Tachiagare Nippon!!|Valhalla Game Studios
|December 22, 2016
|Unreleased
|Unreleased
|
|-
|Poochy & Yoshi's Woolly World|Good-Feel
|January 19, 2017
|February 3, 2017
|February 3, 2017
|
|-
|Dragon Quest VIII: Journey of the Cursed King|Square Enix
|August 27, 2015
|January 20, 2017
|January 20, 2017
|
|-
|HakoBoy! Hakozume Box|HAL Laboratory
|February 2, 2017
|Unreleased
|Unreleased
|
|-
|Mario Sports Superstars|Bandai Namco Studios Camelot Software Planning
|March 30, 2017
|March 24, 2017
|March 10, 2017
|
|-
|Fire Emblem Echoes: Shadows of Valentia|Intelligent Systems
|April 20, 2017
|May 19, 2017
|May 19, 2017
|
|-
|Ever Oasis|Grezzo
|July 13, 2017
|June 23, 2017
|June 23, 2017
|
|-
|Hey! Pikmin|Arzest
|July 13, 2017
|July 28, 2017
|July 28, 2017
|
|-
|Monster Hunter Stories|Marvelous
|October 8, 2016
|September 8, 2017
|September 8, 2017
|
|-
|Metroid: Samus Returns|
|September 15, 2017
|September 15, 2017
|September 15, 2017
|
|-
|Yo-kai Watch 2: Psychic Specters||Level-5
|December 13, 2014
|September 29, 2017
|September 29, 2017
|
|-
|Layton's Mystery Journey: Katrielle and the Millionaires' Conspiracy|Level-5
|July 20, 2017
|October 6, 2017
|October 6, 2017
|
|-
|Mario & Luigi Superstar Saga + Bowser's Minions|AlphaDream
|October 5, 2017
|October 6, 2017
|October 6, 2017
|
|-
|Story of Seasons: Trio of Towns|Marvelous
|June 23, 2016
|February 28, 2017
|October 13, 2017
|
|-
|Style Savvy: Styling Star|Syn Sophia
|November 2, 2017
|December 25, 2017
|November 24, 2017
|
|-
|Kirby Battle Royale|HAL Laboratory
|November 30, 2017
|January 19, 2018
|November 3, 2017
|
|-
|Mario Party: The Top 100|NDcube
|December 28, 2017
|November 10, 2017
|December 22, 2017
|
|-
|Pokémon Ultra Sun and Ultra Moon
|Game Freak
|November 17, 2017
|November 17, 2017
|November 17, 2017
|
|-
|Detective Pikachu|Creatures
|March 23, 2018
|March 23, 2018
|March 23, 2018
|
|-
|Dillon's Dead Heat Breakers|Vanpool
|April 26, 2018
|May 24, 2018
|May 25, 2018
|
|-
|Sushi Striker: The Way of Sushido||
|June 8, 2018
|June 8, 2018
|June 8, 2018
|
|-
|Captain Toad: Treasure Tracker|Nintendo EPDNintendo Software Technology
|July 13, 2018
|July 13, 2018
|July 13, 2018
|
|-
|WarioWare Gold|Intelligent Systems
|August 2, 2018
|August 3, 2018
|July 27, 2018
|
|-
|Yo-Kai Watch Blasters: Red Cat Corps and White Dog Squad
|Level-5
|July 11, 2015
|September 7, 2018
|September 8, 2018
|-
|Luigi's Mansion|Grezzo
|October 19, 2018
|October 12, 2018
|October 19, 2018
|
|-
|Mario & Luigi: Bowser's Inside Story + Bowser Jr.'s Journey|AlphaDream
|December 27, 2018
|January 11, 2019
|January 25, 2019
|
|-
|Yo-kai Watch 3|Level-5
|July 2016
|February 8, 2019
|December 7, 2018
|-
|Kirby's Extra Epic Yarn|Good-FeelHAL Laboratory
|March 8, 2019
|March 8, 2019
|March 8, 2019
|
|}

 New Nintendo 3DS 

 eShop 

Nintendo Switch

 eShop 

Other

Non playing
 Mamaberica Twins Copilas Candy MachineHardware
 Computer Mah-jong Yakuman (1982)
 Pokémon Pikachu (1998)
 Pocket Hello Kitty (1998)
 Pokémon Pikachu 2 GS (1998)

Web
 UPIXO in Action: Mission in Snowdriftland (December 2006)
 Chick Chick Boom'' (April 2007)

Mobile devices

See also
List of Game & Watch games
List of Famicom games
List of Nintendo Entertainment System games
List of Famicom Disk System games
List of Game Boy games
List of Super Nintendo Entertainment System games
List of Super Game Boy games
List of Virtual Boy games
List of Nintendo 64 games
List of Game Boy Color games
List of Game Boy Advance games
List of GameCube games
List of Nintendo DS games
List of Wii games
List of Nintendo 3DS games
List of Wii U games
List of Nintendo Switch games

References

External links
 

Nintendo products
Nintendo games
Products
Nintendo